"James Brown" is a 1989 single by Big Audio Dynamite from their fourth studio album Megatop Phoenix (1989) that peaked at No. 2 on the Billboard US Modern Rock charts.

Track listing
All tracks written by Mick Jones and Don Letts; except "If I Were John Carpenter" written by B.A.D.

12" vinyl
 "James Brown (Remix)" – 6:51
 "James Brown (Remix Edit)" – 3:57
 "If I Were John Carpenter" – 7:24
 "James Brown (LP Version)" – 5:11

Chart performance

"James Brown" and "If I Were John Carpenter" charted together on the Billboard Hot Dance Club Play chart.

References

External links

1989 songs
1989 singles
Big Audio Dynamite songs
Songs written by Mick Jones (The Clash)
Song recordings produced by Mick Jones (The Clash)
Songs written by Don Letts
Songs about musicians
Songs about soul
Cultural depictions of James Brown